The hooded chameleon (Calumma cucullatum) is a Vulnerable species of chameleon endemic to north-east Madagascar; its geological type locality is Madagascar.

Distribution and habitat
Calumma cucullatum can be found in north-eastern Madagascar, and its geological type locality is Madagascar, where it is found in humid forests. The species was once found at Marojejy National Park, the most northern where it has been recorded, and Marolambo, the southernmost. The International Union for Conservation of Nature (IUCN) has classed C. cucullatum as s vulnerable species, as it is threatened by many factors such as the slash-and-burn method of agriculture.

Taxonomy
The species was first described by Gray in 1831 as the Chamaeleon cucullatus. Duméril and Bibron described it in 1836: 227 as Chamaeleo cucullatus, and Gray described it as Bradypodium cucullatum in 1865: 351. The same year, Gray also described it as the Calumma cucullata. In 1911: 32, Werner described the species as Chamaeleon cucullatus. In 1986, Klaver and Böhme described it as Calumma cucullata, and the same for Glaw and Vences in 1994: 247 and Necas in 1999: 274. Lutzmann and Lutzmann described it as Calumma cucullatum in 2004.

References

Reptiles described in 1831
Taxa named by John Edward Gray
Calumma
Fauna of the Madagascar lowland forests